This is a list of results of the rugby league team the Gold Coast Titans from their debut season in 2007 to present day in the National Rugby League.

National Rugby League

2007

Source: NRL 2007 - Gold Coast Titans Summary

2008

Source: NRL 2008 - Gold Coast Titans Summary

2009

Source: NRL 2009 - Gold Coast Titans Summary

2010

Source: NRL 2010 - Gold Coast Titans Summary

2011

Source: NRL 2011 - Gold Coast Titans Summary

2012

Source: NRL 2012 - Gold Coast Titans Summary

2013

Source: NRL 2013 - Gold Coast Titans Summary

2014

Source: NRL 2014 - Gold Coast Titans Summary

2015

Source: NRL 2015 - Gold Coast Titans Summary

2016

Source:

Win–loss record

Results
National Rugby League lists
Gold Coast, Queensland-related lists